The Nulhegan Band of the Coosuk Abenaki Nation is a state-recognized tribe and nonprofit organization, called AHA "Abenaki Helping Abenaki", whose headquarters and land are based in Vermont. They are often referred to as the Nulhegan Abenaki Tribe or simply, Nulhegan.

The Nulhegan Band has approximately 1,400 members, most of whom reside in the Northeast Kingdom of Vermont.

Vermont recognized the Nulhegan Band of the Coosuk Abenaki Nation in 2011. The Nulhegan are one of four state-recognized tribes in Vermont. They participate at the state level in many ways, including in the Vermont Commission of Native American Affairs.

They are not federally recognized as a Native American tribe. Vermont has no federally recognized tribes.

Etymology 

The Nulhegan Band of the Coosuk Abenaki Nation draws its name the Nulhegan River, a tributary to the Connecticut River and Nulhegan Basin near Brighton, Vermont. Its name means "the place of log traps." The band is also named for the Cowasuck people and Abenaki people, one of the tribes that inhabited a large portion of eastern Vermont and western New Hampshire.

Leadership 
The Nulhegan Abenaki government is made up of a Chief (Sogomo), who is nominated by the councils and decided by election. The current chief of the Nulhegan is Chief Don Stevens. The legislative branch includes an elected Tribal Council of 5 to 13 members, all from within the tribe. The judicial branch is represented by an Elders Council. The government manages the tribe's land, activities, gatherings, and interacts with the state of Vermont in official matters.

Nonprofit organization 
The Nulhegan Band founded a 501(c)(3) nonprofit organization called AHA "Abenaki Helping Abenaki" in 2006. In 2019, the Tides Foundation provided it with a grant of $50,000.

Lucy Neel, based in Barton and Derby Line, Vermont, is the organization's registered agent. The current officers are:
 Chief Donald Stevens, president
 Nicole St. Ogle, treasurer
 Lucy Cannon-Neel, secretary.

Land 
In 2012, the Nulhegan Abenaki Tribe acquired some of the first tribal-owned and controlled land in Vermont for nearly 200 years. The 65 acres located in Barton, VT, where the tribal headquarters are, "will be an economic, educational and cultural resource for the tribe, which worked with the Vermont Land Trust and the Sierra Club to acquire the forestland."

History 
In June 1812, white settlers recorded that a band of Abenaki lived at Owls Head Mountain on Lake Memphremagog in Potton, Quebec, in the Memphremagog Region Abenaki. 

Documenting Abenaki history and heritage in Vermont and New Hampshire has at times been difficult. The national eugenics movement resulted in many Abenaki families being listed in census records as other races and ethnicities; some also underwent name changes from what they say were the original Abenaki or Canadian French. Additionally, the unreliability of family stories, or misinterpreted records from this era, also resulted in non-Abenaki believing they have Abenaki heritage when they do not. 

On June 25, 1978, the first record of a 20th-century repatriation and reburial of Abenaki remains takes place in Center Harbor, New Hampshire. On November 15, 1980, the first record of a repatriation and reburial of Abenaki remains takes place in Vermont after a set of Abenaki remains is discovered at the Putney Historical Society in Putney, Vermont. Blackie Lampman and Richard Phillips ask Beverly Bolding to facilitate the repatriation.

During this time, many groups consisting of small families said they were now returning to their Abenaki heritage after having denied it for the first half of the 20th century. Other claimants to Abenaki heritage also emerged, including those who had never before claimed Abenaki ancestry. This included the Nulhegan, who began as a nonprofit organization. This caused tension between the European Americans claiming Abenaki status and the extant Abenaki First Nations in Canada, such as the Odanak First Nation who see the Vermont Abenaki as illegitimate due to their lack of Abenaki ancestry, and their lack of cultural continuity from any historic tribe.

In 2006, The Vermont Legislature recognized the Abenaki as a "Minority Population" within the State of Vermont under Statute 853. This entitled the Abenaki protections as a disadvantaged race of people. However, since there were no recognized Abenaki Indian Tribes in Vermont, there were "legally" no Abenaki people under the law. On March 16, 2008, the Vermont Indigenous Alliance is formed by Elnu Abenaki Tribe, Koasek Abenaki Tribe, Missisquoi Abenaki Tribe with the purpose of unifying the tribes and pursuing official state-recognition from Vermont. Finally, on April 22, 2011, the Nulhegan was officially recognized by the State of Vermont as an Abenaki Indian Tribe.

In 2013, Wabanaagig TV from the Aboriginal Peoples Television Network in Canada produces the movie, The Vermont Abenaki: A struggle for recognition, which documents the struggle for Vermont State recognition and culminates with the celebration of state recognition.

From August 19 to 22, 2015, the annual Wabanaki Confederacy Conference was held in Shelburne, Vermont. This was the first and only time the Wabanaki Confederacy was hosted in Vermont.

20th-century eugenics survey effects 
The Abenaki, along with French Canadians and other victims deemed "undesirable" were subject to eugenics practices occurring in Vermont during the 1920s and 1930s. 
 Due to this, some Abenaki families hid their heritage. Chief Don Stevens of the Nulhegan said, "My grandmother was listed in the eugenics survey, which caused her to deny her heritage, and she wasn't able to be proud of that."

The Abenaki who chose to remain in the United States did not fare as well as their Canadian counterparts. Tribal connections were lost as those Abenaki who were tolerated by the Anglo population were assimilated into colonial society. What familial groups remained were often eradicated, in the early 20th century, through forced sterilization and pregnancy termination policies in Vermont. Official records list 253 recorded cases of sterilization, but some estimate there were over 3,400 cases of sterilization of Abenaki having been performed, many of which involved termination of an unborn fetus. No documentation of informed consent for these procedures was found. At the time, many of the children who were sterilized were not even aware of what the physicians had done to them. This was performed under the auspices of the Brandon School of the Feeble-Minded, and the Vermont Reform School. It was documented in the 1911 "Preliminary Report of the Committee of the Eugenic Section of the American Breeder's Association to Study and to Report on the Best Practical Means for Cutting Off the Defective Germ-Plasm in the Human Population."

The State of Vermont and the University of Vermont both formally apologized and recognized its role in the eugenics surveys in a formal resolution.

Controversy and federal recognition attempts of neighboring tribes 
After the 1970s, the leadership of the Odanak Abenaki Band Council, the governing body of the Odanak band of the Abenaki First Nation, denounced any groups claiming to be Abenaki in the United States.

The legitimacy of groups such as the Nulhegan Band have been questioned due to claims that the root ancestors they claim were Abenaki were actually Europeans. Other root ancestors, though Native, have been claimed to not be Abenaki.

In the final determination of the 2005 petition for federal recognition by a related state-recognized tribe, the St. Francis/Sokoki Band Abenakis of Vermont, the BIA states: "The details of this claimed process of living 'underground,' however, are not explained by the petitioner. Some of the available documentation indicates that some of the group's ancestors moved from various locations in Quebec, Canada, to the United States over the course of the 19th century, but the available evidence does not demonstrate that the petitioner or its claimed ancestors descended from the St. Francis Indians of Quebec, another Indian group in Canada, a Missisquoi Abenaki entity in Vermont, or any other Western Abenaki group or Indian entity from New England in existence before or after 1800. The available evidence indicates that no external observers from 1800 to 1975 described the petitioner or its claimed ancestors, or any group of Indians, as an Indian entity or a distinct Indian community in northwestern Vermont," referring to groups such as the Nulhegan and Ko'asek.

State-recognition
The State of Vermont designated the Nulhegan Band of the Coosuk Abenaki Nation as a state-recognized tribe through Vermont Statutes Title 1, Section 854 in 2011. The other three state-recognized tribes in Vermont are the Missisquoi Abenaki Tribe, Elnu Abenaki Tribe, and the Koasek Abenaki Tribe.

Heritage 
The Nulhegan Band of the Coosuk Abenaki Nation identify as being Abenaki and Cowasuck.

St. Mary's University associate professor Darryl Leroux's genealogical and historical research found that the members of this and the other three state-recognized tribes in Vermont were primarily French descendants who have used old ancestry in New France to shift into an 'Abenaki' identity.

In 2002, the State of Vermont reported that the Abenaki people had migrated north to Quebec by the end of the 17th century.

Activities 
The Nulhegan Abenaki Tribe host multiple gatherings every year, including drumming events and an annual pow wow. The first is at the Winter Solstice in late December. The second is the annual Snow Snake Games held at the end of February or early March. The last and biggest gathering is the annual Nulheganaki gathering held every year at the end of August or beginning of September.

Vermont, unofficially in 2016 and officially in 2020, celebrated Indigenous Peoples Day instead of Columbus Day. The state did not want to celebrated Christopher Columbus, due to his role in the  genocide of Indigenous peoples of the Americas. Celebrations of Indigenous heritage and culture are now held across the state. The Nulhegan Abenaki host "Indigenous People's Day Rock."

In 2020, Nulhegan Band launched the Abenaki Trails Project, which provides educational material about Abenaki historic sites beginning in West Hopkinton, New Hampshire.

The Nulhegan Band has spoken with Middlebury College regarding the college's land acknowledgment, which highlights the Western Abenaki.In State v. Elliott, a 1992) the Vermont Supreme Court ruled that all aboriginal title in Vermont was extinguished "by the increasing weight of history."

State and federal laws 
The Vermont Fish and Wildlife Department granted members of state-recognized Vermont tribes a free permanent fishing license, or if the applicant qualifies for a hunting license, a free permanent combination hunting and fishing license.

Vermont H.556, "An act relating to exempting property owned by Vermont-recognized Native American tribes from property tax," passed on April 20, 2022.

As a state-recognized tribe, the Nulhegan Abenaki may legal obtain eagle feathers and other animals parts of endangered animal species for usage but not sale.

Notable people

 Jesse Bruchac, author and linguist
 Joseph Bruchac, author

Notes

References

External links
 Nulhegan Band website
 Vermont Commission on Native American Affairs
 "Nulhegan Abenaki Attain First Tribal Forestland in More Than 200 Years."

Abenaki heritage groups
Cultural organizations based in Vermont
French American
Non-profit organizations based in Vermont
State-recognized tribes in the United States
2006 establishments in Vermont